Frederick Sinclaire (1881–1954) was a notable New Zealand Unitarian minister, pacifist, social critic, university professor and essayist. He was born in Papakura Valley, Auckland, New Zealand in 1881.

References

External links
Annotations (1920 booklet by Sinclaire)

1881 births
1954 deaths
New Zealand Unitarians
New Zealand academics
People from Auckland